Erkin Abdulla (born July 8, 1978) is a Uyghur musician music style is contemporary folk, Uyghur pop and flamenco.

Biography

Born in Qopan, a small village in Kargilik, Kashgar, Xinjiang Uyghur Autonomous Region, China, on July 8, 1978. He started studying guitar when he was twelve. In 1997, he went to Beijing to go to university and started his music career. Graduated from the Minzu University of China, Central Conservatory of Music and Los Angeles Musicians Institute. Erkin Abdulla is a Uyghur musician, music style is Contemporary Folk, Uyghur pop and Flamenco. With his unique voice and superb guitar skills, his music has various elements. Erkin combined Uyghur folk and modern music styles to create a cross-cultural and borderless global music style. In 2002, released  first album "Caravan", was awarded “Best Musical Album” and “Best Adapted Folk Music” of the Nanning International Folk Song Art Festival. In 2003, won The Pop Musician Golden Medal at the Chinese National Vocal Competition. His original song “Uyghur girl” won the Nanning International Folk Song Art Festival's "Ten Golden Melody Awards". Another original song "Can't Live Without You" won "Best Music Award" at the Asia Music Festival which was held in Shanghai, China. In 2004, released second album “One Thousand and One Nights”. He held a live concert tour in Xinjiang Uyghur Autonomous Region and became the symbolic figure of Kashgar City. In 2005, released third album "Night of the City", He won the 2005–2007 Chinese annual Golden Record "Rock Class Musicians’ Award". In 2006, released fourth album "The Story of Dungköwruk". His original song “What's Up” won the “Best Original Music Award “in Xinjiang Uyghur Autonomous Region’s Kurban Eid festival concert. In 2007, released  fifth album “Blog”, his original song “Kashgar” won the “Golden Medal Award” in the Xinjiang Uyghur Autonomous Region Network MV Contest. In 2008, Erkin released his sixth album “The Thousand Caves”. He became the music director for the Children's Art Group's album “Colorful Kashgar”. For his songs “Mother” and “Helpless” he won the Xinjiang Uyghur Autonomous Region Original Pop Music Contest “Golden Melody Award”. In 2012, he held his personal concert at Baoli Theater in Beijing, China. In 2013, he released his seventh album “Trace”. In 2014, he became a judge for the TV show “Voice of the Silk Road”. In 2014, he moved to the United States to start his global music career. As a Uyghur musician, Erkin Abdulla has been focusing on the development of the Uyghur ethnic traditional music heritage. He has fully learned the ancient Uyghur Muqam – Dolan's artistic essence, created many songs with Uyghur ancient and modern elements, like “The Eagle of Tengri Tagh”, “The Thousand Caves” the best modern Uyghur music. Also, he consolidated, produced, performed and did the adaptations for the Pamir ethnic folk rhythms which are becoming extinct in recent years. He always dedicates his music works to enrich the Uyghur ethnic culture and make the music world more colorful.

Music style
Erkin Abdulla is a Uyghur musician, music style is Contemporary Folk, Uyghur pop and Flamenco. With his unique voice and superb guitar skills, his music has various elements. Erkin combined Uyghur folk and modern music styles to create a cross-cultural and borderless global music style. As a Uyghur musician, Erkin Abdulla has been focusing on the development of the Uyghur ethnic traditional music heritage. He has fully learned the ancient Uyghur Muqam – Dolan's artistic essence, created many songs with Uyghur ancient and modern elements, like “The Eagle of Tengri Tagh”, “The Thousand Caves” the best modern Uyghur music. Also, he consolidated, produced, performed and did the adaptations for the Pamir ethnic folk rhythms which are becoming extinct in recent years. He always dedicates his music works to enrich the Uyghur ethnic culture and make the music world more colorful.

Personal life
Erkin Abdulla is married and the father of three children, two boys and a girl. The eldest child, a boy, is named Ilker Erkin; the second child, also a boy, is named Ilter Erkin and the youngest child, a girl, is named Zilale Erkin.

Discography

Studio albums
Dolan Out of the Desert (August 7, 2002)
1,001 Nights / Arabian Nights (March 9, 2003)
City Night (June 2005)
Grand Bazaar Story / Döngköwrük's Story (Mat 2006)
Blog (2007)
Thousand Buddha Caves (2008)
Footprint (2013)

Video CDs
Arken: Guitar Prince (April 2004) 
City Night (June 2005)

Awards

At the end of 2002, at Nanning's "International Folk Music Art Festival", Erkin Abdulla won Best Individual Album Awards for his first album (The Dolan Out of the Desert).
October 2003: Erkin Abdulla won a first prize in the area of Popular Music from the Ministry of Culture of the People's Republic of China at the 2003 National Vocal Music Competition.
November 2003: Erkin Abdulla's work "Uyghur Girl" was ranked among the Best Ten Golden Hits Award.
November 2003: Erkin Abdulla's work "Men öley" won the Best New Artist's WorkAward at the 6th Annual Shanghai Zhenmei Cup Asian Music Festival.
November 2003: Erkin Abdulla won the Silver Award at the "Asia New Singer Competition" at the 6th Annual Shanghai Zhenmei Cup Asian Music Festival.
2005-2007: Erkin Abdulla was awarded Golden Disc Awards for his music.

See also
Ablajan Awut Ayup
Murat Nasyrov

References

External links
 

1978 births
Living people
Chinese male singer-songwriters
Singers from Xinjiang
Minzu University of China alumni
Musicians from Xinjiang
People from Kashgar
Uyghurs
21st-century Chinese male singers